Pete or Peter Doherty may  refer to:

Pete Doherty (born 1979), English musician
Pete Doherty (wrestler) (born 1945), American wrestler
Peter Doherty (immunologist) (born 1940), Australian immunologist and Nobel Prize winner
Peter Doherty (footballer) (1913–1990), Northern Ireland footballer
Peter Doherty (comics), British comic-book artist

See also
Peter Docherty (born 1929), English footballer
Peter O'Doherty, Australian musician and artist
Stalking Pete Doherty, a rockumentary